The following list includes notable people who were born or have lived in Carbondale, Illinois. For a similar list organized alphabetically by last name, see the category page People from Carbondale, Illinois.1. Treston a Luna

Arts and culture

Crime 

Daniel Woloson Serial Rape; Robbery Strangle Susan Schumake

Military

Politics

Sports

References

Carbondale
Carbondale